Neoguillauminia is a genus of plants in the family Euphorbiaceae first described as a genus in 1938. It contains only one known species, Neoguillauminia cleopatra,  endemic to New Caledonia. Its closest relative is Calycopeplus from Australia.

References 

Euphorbieae
Endemic flora of New Caledonia
Monotypic Euphorbiaceae genera
Taxa named by Henri Ernest Baillon
Taxa named by Léon Croizat